The OPAP Cyprus Basketball All-Star Game is an annual basketball event in Cyprus, organised by the Cyprus Basketball Federation and sponsored by OPAP and was established in 2011. The event is being held mostly at the end of the year, around Christmas time and consists of a game between a Cyprus/Europe and a Rest of the World team, a three-point shoot contest and slam-dunk exhibition activities which replaced the slam-dunk contest. Since its inception it has been considered the biggest annual basketball event in Cyprus. All the games have been held in the 6,000 Eleftheria Indoor Hall, in Nicosia.The event was not held in 2020 and 2021 due to the pandemic, but it is scheduled to resume on 17 December 2022.

List of games
Bold: Team that won the game.

Three-Point Shoot Contest

Slam-Dunk champions

Players with most appearances

References

Basketball all-star games
Basketball in Cyprus
Basketball in Greece